Felicia cana is a low and slender shrublet of up to  high, covered in white felty hairs, that is assigned to the family Asteraceae. Very characteristic for the species are also the middle-long hairs with forked tips on the surface of its fruits. It is an endemic species that is restricted to a zone along the southern coast of the Western Cape province of South Africa.

Description 
All parts except for the florets are covered in dense white felty hairs. The leaves are arranged alternately, are succulent, inverted lance-shaped in outline, up to 1 cm (0.6 in) long and 1 mm (0.06 in) wide, set at an oblique upward angle.

Just beneath the flower heads the indumentum is less dense.

In the center of the head are many yellow, bisexual disc florets of about 2 mm (0.1 in) long. In the center of the corolla of each disc floret are five anthers merged into a tube, through which the style grows when the floret opens, hoovering up the pollen on its shaft. The style in both ray- and disc florets forks, and at the tip of both style branches is a broadly triangular appendage.

Surrounding the base of the corolla are many white, deciduous pappus bristles of about 2 mm (0.1 in) long, that are strongly serrated near the base and weakly near the top. The middle long hairs that also occur scattered along its surface have a forked tip, but the hairs along the edge are not widened near their tips.

Differences with related species 
F. cana is closely related to F. hyssopifolia, but differs from it by its dense covering of white felty hairs, the hairs on the surface of the cypselae that fork at their tips and the slender habit.

Taxonomy 
Augustin Pyramus de Candolle was the first to recognise the distinctiveness of this species from Felicia hyssopifolia, and he described it in 1836 as Felicia cana, based on a collection made by Ecklon in 1805 near Swellendam. William Henry Harvey regarded it as a variety of Aster hyssopifolia (now Felicia hyssopifolia), making the combination Aster hyssopifolia var. canus. Jürke Grau agreed with De Candolle in his 1973 Revision of the genus Felicia, and restored the taxon to a species within the genus Felicia.

Distribution and conservation 
Felicia cana occurs in the Western Cape province of South Africa between Riversdale and Bredasdorp.

The continued survival of this species is considered to be of least concern, because it has a stable population.

References

External links 
 line drawing of Felicia cana
 distribution map of Felicia cana

cana
Endemic flora of South Africa
Plants described in 1836